José Carabalí may refer to:

 José Carabalí (athlete) (born 1970), Venezuelan runner
 José Carabalí (footballer) (born 1997), Ecuadorian football player